Olivier Boivin (born June 6, 1965) is a French sprint canoer.

Career
Boivin competed from the late 1980s to the mid-1990s.

He won a bronze medal in the C-2 1000 m event at the 1992 Summer Olympics in Barcelona. He also won seven medals at the ICF Canoe Sprint World Championships with four silvers (C-2 1000 m: 1989, 1991, 1993; C-2 10000 m: 1989) and three bronzes (C-2 200 m: 1994, C-2 500 m: 1991, C-4 200 m: 1995).

References

Sports-reference.com profile

1965 births
Canoeists at the 1992 Summer Olympics
French male canoeists
Living people
Olympic canoeists of France
Olympic bronze medalists for France
Olympic medalists in canoeing
ICF Canoe Sprint World Championships medalists in Canadian
Medalists at the 1992 Summer Olympics
Mediterranean Games medalists in canoeing
Mediterranean Games gold medalists for France
Competitors at the 1991 Mediterranean Games